Mark Pattison may refer to:

 Mark Pattison (academic) (1813–1884), English author, priest, and rector
 Mark Pattison (American football) (born 1961), NFL wide receiver
Marc Pattison, musician in Futures End

See also
Mark Patterson (disambiguation)
Mark Paterson (disambiguation)